A Flea on the Scales (Portuguese: Uma Pulga na Balança) is a 1953 Brazilian comedy film directed by Luciano Salce and starring Waldemar Wey, Gilda Nery and Geraldo José de Almeida.

Cast
 Waldemar Wey as Dorival  
 Gilda Nery as Dora  
 Geraldo José de Almeida 
 Vicente Leporace
 José Rubens
 Ruy Afonso 
 Geraldo Ambrosi 
 Francisco Arisa 
 Paulo Autran as Antenor  
 Tito Livio Baccarin 
 Jaime Barcellos 
 Maurício Barroso 
 Xandó Batista 
 Célia Biar 
 Lola Brah as Bibi  
 Luiz Calderaro as Carlos  
 Dan Camara 
 Nelson Camargo 
 Benjamin Cattan 
 Benedito Corsi 
 Maria Augusta Costa Leite 
 João Costa
 Armando Couto 
 Antônio Dourado 
 Kleber Menezes Dória 
 Marcelo Fiori
 Antônio Fragoso 
 João Franco
 Felício Fuchs 
 Galileu Garcia 
 João Batista Giotti 
 Wanda Hamel 
 John Herbert as Alberto  
 Artur Herculano 
 Roberto Lombardi 
 Edith Lorena 
 Labiby Madi 
 Cavagnole Neto 
 Lima Neto 
 Antonio Olinto 
 Geraldo Santos Pereira 
 João Rosa 
 Pilade Rossi
 Jesuíno Santos 
 Mário Senna 
 Erminio Spalla 
 Vicente Spalla 
 Maria Luiza Splendore 
 Michael Stoll 
 Mário Sergio as Juvenal  
 Francisco Tamura 
 Francisco Taricano 
 Eva Wilma
 Fausto Zip

References

Bibliography
 Moliterno, Gino. The A to Z of Italian Cinema. Scarecrow Press, 2009.

External links

1953 comedy films
1953 films
Brazilian comedy films
1950s Portuguese-language films
Films directed by Luciano Salce
Brazilian black-and-white films